Doğanpınar is a village in the Pülümür District, Tunceli Province, Turkey. The village is populated by Kurds of the Sisan tribe and had a population of 128 in 2021.

The hamlet of Bük is attached to the village.

References 

Kurdish settlements in Tunceli Province
Villages in Pülümür District